Devraj Thyagaraj Patil (born 6 December 1984 in Shimoga, Karnataka) is an Indian first-class cricketer who played for Karnataka and the Royal Challengers Bangalore. He is right-handed wicket-keeper batsman.

Career in RCB

During the 2010 and 2011 edition, his contributions to the team helped to stabilise the RCB middle order batting.

References

External links
 

1984 births
Living people
Indian cricketers
Karnataka cricketers
Royal Challengers Bangalore cricketers
People from Shimoga
Wicket-keepers